*En or *Enji is a reconstructed name of the fire or thunder god in the Albanian pagan mythology, which has continued to be used in the Albanian language to refer to Thursday (e enjte). The theonym Enete was used by Albanian scholar and language master Kostandin Kristoforidhi in 1879 as the Albanian translation of Greek Zeus / Δία.

In Albanian tradition fire (zjarri) is worshiped as a deity, and it is regarded as the Sun's offspring (pjella e Diellit), which is symbolized by the fire hearth (vatra e zjarrit). Several fire deities are attested in Albanian folk beliefs: Verbti, a fire, water and wind god, and the hearth-fire deities (hyjni/perëndi të zjarrit të vatrës) like Vitore / gjarpri i vatrës and Nëna e Vatrës.

According to some scholars, the deity to whom Thursday was dedicated was worshiped by the Illyrians in antiquity and he may have been the most prominent god of the pantheon in Roman times, when week-day names were formed in the Albanian language.

Name

Documentation 
The root of the name of the Albanian deity is thought to be found in antiquity in the Pannonian-Illyrian area, as well as in Messapia/Iapygia in southern Italy such as Ennius, interpreted as a theophoric name: "the one dedicated to En". Other examples with the same root and with the suffix -c (-k) are Enica, Enicus, Enicenius, and with the suffix -n are Eninna, Ennenia, and the short forms Enna and Enno. Compounds of the divine name En are Enoclia "En, the famous", and Malennius containing the Albanian term mal "mountain", interpreted as "the one dedicated to En of/from the mountain".

In his work Speculum Confessionis (1621) Pjetër Budi recorded the Albanian term tegnietenee madhe for the observance of Maundy Thursday (S.C., 148, vv. 26, 89). In his Latin-Albanian dictionary (Dictionarium latino-epiroticum, 1635), Frang Bardhi recorded dita ehegnete as the Albanian translation of Latin dies Iovis. In 1820, the French scholar François Pouqueville recorded two old Albanian terms: e igniete and e en-gnitia. In 1879 Albanian scholar and language master Kostandin Kristoforidhi translated Zeus / Δία of the original Greek text with the Albanian Ἒνετε Enete, and Hermes / Ἑρμῆν with the Albanian Μερκούρ Merkur.

Modern dialectal variations of "Thursday" include: ; ; .

Etymology 
The names of week days in Albanian are calques of Latin names. Since enjte appears to be the Albanian translation of Latin Iovis diem ('Day of Jove'), the god Enj- or En(ni) of the early Albanian pantheon may have been seen as the equivalent of Roman Jupiter.

The Albanian term enjte ('Thurday') is considered to be a te-adjective descending from the Proto-Albanian stem *agni-, ultimately from *h1n̥gʷnis, the archaic Proto-Indo-European word for 'fire' as an active force.

Historical reconstruction 

According to scholar Karl Treimer, Illyrians worshiped a fire god named *Enji, related to the Vedic fire god Agni, and descending from the stem *H1n̩gwnis, the Proto-Indo-European divinised fire. In the Illyrian pantheon the fire deity would have expanded his function considerably, therefore ousting the cosmic-heavenly deity, becoming the most distinguished Illyrian god in Roman times at the time when the weekday names were formed in the Albanian language. In this view the Latin Jovis dies was equated to the Illyrian fire god Enj rather than to the Illyrian Sky father, thought to have been Zot, from Proto-Albanian *dźie̅u ̊ *a(t)t (a cognate of PIE *Dyḗus ph2tḗr), or Dei-pátrous. With the coming of Christianity, En would have been demoted to demonic status, although his name has been preserved in the Albanian language to refer to Thursday (enj-te).

Fire deities and cults in Albanian tradition 
The cult of the mystic fire and the fire ritual practices played an important role in the lives of the pre-industrial Albanian people.

Strong beliefs in the demon of fire have persisted among Albanians until today. Verbti is a fire, water and wind god worshiped in northern Albania until recent times. The purifying power of fire underlies the popular idea according to which this deity is the enemy of uncleanliness and the opponent of filth. Deities associated with the Albanian hearth-fire cult are Vitore / gjarpri i vatrës and Nëna e Vatrës.

In Albanian tradition fire itself is worshiped as a deity, and it is regarded as the Sun's offspring (pjella e Diellit), which is symbolized by the fire hearth (vatra e zjarrit). The place of the ignition of fire is traditionally built in the center of the house and of circular shape representing the Sun. Traditionally the fire of the hearth, zjarri i vatrës, is identified with the existence of the family and its extinguishing is considered a bad omen for the family. The fire of the domestic hearth holds divine attributes in folk beliefs, being considered the sustainer of the continuity between the world of the living and that of the dead, and ensuring the continuity of the tribe (fis) from generation to generation.

Rose Wilder Lane (1923) provided the following description regarding the northern Albanian fire cult:

See also

Agni
Albanian mythology
Illyrian religion
Perëndi
Prende
Zojz (deity)

Sources

Citations

Bibliography

Albanian mythology
Illyrian gods
Fire gods
Paleo-Balkan mythology